Creeting is part of the name of two villages in Suffolk, England:

Creeting St Mary
Creeting St Peter